Geoffrey Michaels (born 1944 in Perth, Western Australia) is a prominent violinist and violist. A child prodigy in the 1950s, he currently performs and teaches primarily in the United States.

Biography 

Geoffrey Michaels began taking violin lessons at the age of five, and soon was recognized as a prodigy.   At 14, he became the youngest performer ever to win the Australian Broadcasting Commission’s concerto competition,   and made his first recording, which sold out within weeks of its release.

At the age of 16 he went to the United States to attend the Curtis Institute of Music, where he studied violin with Efrem Zimbalist, and violin and viola with Oscar Shumsky. While still a student he became a member of the Curtis String Quartet. He then pursued a solo career, winning the fourth annual Emma Feldman Competition in Philadelphia, and placing among the finalists in the Long-Thibaud-Crespin Competition in Paris, the Queen Elizabeth Competition in Brussels, and the Tchaikovsky Competition in Moscow,  where he played  Zimbalist’s ‘Coq d’Or Fantasy.

He has been a professor at Swarthmore College, Florida State University and the University of British Columbia. Michaels currently lives in the Philadelphia area.

Performances 
Michaels is a sought-after soloist and chamber music player. Notable contemporary concerto performances include the US premier of Alfred Schnittke’s Concerto Grosso   (broadcast on Voice of America), and Arvo Pärt’s Tabula Rasa for Two Violins and Strings and Fratres, both at Lincoln Center in New York.

During his many tours of Australia, he collaborated with pianist and composer Roger Smalley. Smalley’s “Trio for Violin, Cello, and Piano” (1990–91), commissioned by the Melbourne International Chamber Music Competition, bears the dedication “To Geoffrey Michaels.”

He is a founding member of the Liebesfreud Quartet and has also performed in many other chamber ensembles, including the Janus Piano Trio, Performers' Committee for Twentieth Century Music (New York), Richardson Chamber Players (Princeton), and Vancouver New Music Society.

References 

1944 births
Living people
20th-century classical violinists
21st-century classical violinists
Australian classical violinists
Male classical violinists
Musicians from Perth, Western Australia
20th-century Australian male musicians
20th-century Australian musicians
21st-century Australian male musicians
21st-century Australian musicians